Barometer is a 2013 sculpture by Devin Laurence Field, to be installed at the newly constructed Hillsboro Ballpark in Oregon, United States. Installation of the work began on June 10, 2013.

Description
Barometer, commissioned by the City of Hillsboro for the newly constructed Hillsboro Ballpark, was designed by Northwest sculpture Devin Laurence Field. Field's design was chosen from twenty qualified candidates by an artist, design team, the Hillsboro Arts & Culture Council, and the Parks and Recreation Department. According to Fields, "the piece takes the overall triangular form of the baseball diamond held aloft by columns and illuminated with color changing, sound activated LED lights. The laser-cut skin of the diamond form is adorned with intricate patterns of baseball bats and balls [and other sports equipment]. Around the sculpture are various 'instruments' people can play, a giant horn, a rattle roller, drum sets and chimes that together form a symphony of sounds. When no one is at the park there is no colored light, when there is noise it lights up — the louder the noise, the brighter the light. The art is a veritable Barometer of excitement for the ballpark."

See also
 2013 in art
 List of public art in Hillsboro, Oregon
 Weather Machine, a sculpture in Portland, Oregon that displays daily weather predictions

References

External links
Art at Hillsboro baseball park to respond to Hops fans with lights and music
Hillsboro Hops to chip in on public art at sports complex

2013 establishments in Oregon
2013 sculptures
Interactive art
Outdoor sculptures in Hillsboro, Oregon
Stainless steel sculptures in Oregon